DWOP (103.9 FM), on-air as 103.9 Fam Radio, is a radio station owned by Kaissar Broadcasting Network and operated by Family Radio Broadcasting. The station's studio and transmitter is located at Brgy. Tarosanan, Camaligan.

The station was formerly managed by Sonia O. Leano's SOL Broadcasting from 2012 to 2021, when it went off the air. At that time, it was located along Magsaysay Ave., Naga, Camarines Sur. In September 2022, Family Radio Broadcasting leased the station.

References

Radio stations in Naga, Camarines Sur
Radio stations established in 2012